David John Colville, 1st Baron Clydesmuir,  (13 February 1894 – 31 October 1954), was a Scottish Unionist politician, and industrialist.  He was director of his family's steel and iron business, David Colville & Sons.

Early life and education
The only son of John Colville MP, of Cleland, Lanarkshire, and Christina Marshall Colville, he was educated at Charterhouse and at Trinity College, Cambridge.

He served in World War I with the 6th Battalion of the Cameronians (Scottish Rifles), and was wounded.

Political career
He was unsuccessful National Liberal candidate for Motherwell at the 1922 general election. He was unsuccessful again at a by-election in January 1929 for Midlothian and Peebles Northern, but won the seat the general election in May 1929, remaining as the constituency's Member of Parliament (MP) until 1943. He served in the National Government as Parliamentary Secretary to the Department of Overseas Trade from 1931 to 1935, as Under-Secretary of State for Scotland from 1935 to 1936, as Financial Secretary to the Treasury from 1936 to 1938 and as Secretary of State for Scotland from 1938 until 1940.

Diplomatic career and peerage
Colville left Parliament in 1943 to become Governor of Bombay, a post he held until January 1948. He acted as Viceroy and Governor-General of India, in 1945, 1946 and 1947. On his return from India he was raised to the peerage as Baron Clydesmuir, of Braidwood in the County of Lanarkshire.  From 1950 to 1954 Lord Clydesmuir served as a Governor of the BBC.

Colville was appointed a Privy Counsellor in 1936 and was a Brigadier in the Royal Company of Archers. He was Lord Lieutenant of Lanarkshire from 1952 until his death.

Marriage and children
He married Agnes Anne Bilsland, daughter of Sir William Bilsland, in 1915. They had a son and two daughters.

His son, Ronald Colville, 2nd Baron Clydesmuir, served as Governor of the Bank of Scotland.

Arms

References

Torrance, David, The Scottish Secretaries (Birlinn 2006)
Who Was Who

External links
 

1894 births
1954 deaths
Colville, John
Members of the Privy Council of the United Kingdom
Knights Grand Commander of the Order of the Indian Empire
Lord-Lieutenants of Lanarkshire
Cameronians officers
People educated at Charterhouse School
Alumni of Trinity College, Cambridge
BBC Governors
Colville, John
Colville, John
Colville, John
Governors of Bombay
Colville, John
20th-century Scottish businesspeople
People associated with Stirling (council area)
Politics of Midlothian
People associated with South Lanarkshire
Members of the Royal Company of Archers
Ministers in the Chamberlain wartime government, 1939–1940
Ministers in the Chamberlain peacetime government, 1937–1939
Barons created by George VI
1